The Diocese of Tournai is a Latin Church ecclesiastical territory or diocese of the Catholic Church in Belgium. The diocese was formed in 1146, upon the dissolution of the Diocese of Noyon and Tournai, which had existed since the seventh Century. It is now suffragan in the ecclesiastical province of the metropolitan Archdiocese of Mechelen–Brussels. The cathedra is found within the Cathedral of Notre-Dame de Tournai, which has been classified both as a major site for Wallonia's heritage since 1936 and as a World Heritage Site since 2000.

History

As early as the second half of the 3rd century St. Piat evangelized Tournai; some sources name him as the first bishop, but this remains unsubstantiated. At the end of the 3rd century Emperor Maximian rekindled persecutions, and St. Piat was martyred as a result.

Barbarian invasions began shortly afterwards. These lasted from the end of the 3rd century till the end of the 5th century.  St. Remigius used the good-will of the Frankish monarchy to organize the Catholic hierarchy in the North of Gaul. He confided the Diocese of Arras and Cambrai to St. Vaast (Vedastus), and founded the See of Tournai (c. 500), appointing as its titular Eleutherius.

It was probably its status of royal city which secured Tournai's early rise, only to lose its position as capital upon the departure of the Merovingian court. Nevertheless, it maintained its own bishops for nearly a century. Then, at about 626 or 627, under the episcopate of St. Achar, the sees of Tournai and Noyon were reunited, retaining however their separate structures. Tournai lost its privileges and was relegated to level of the neighbouring dioceses, such as Boulogne and Therouanne, Arras and Cambrai. The same ordinary held both sees for five hundred years. It was only in 1146 that Tournai received its own bishop.
 

Notable bishops are: St. Eleutherius (beginning of 6th century); St. Achar (626/27 – 1 March 637/38); St. Eloi (641–660); Simon de Vermandois (1121–1146); Walter de Marvis (1219–1251), the great founder of schools and hospitals; Etienne of Tournai (1192–1203), godfather of Louis VII of France and minister to the queen; Andrea Chini Malpiglia (1334–42), cardinal and papal legate; Guillaume Fillastre (1460–1473), chancellor of the Golden Fleece; Michel de Warenghien (1283–1291), a very erudite doctor; Michel d'Esne (1597–1614), the author of several works. Raphael de Mercatellis (1487–1507), illegitimate son of Philip the Good and noted bibliophile, was auxiliary bishop of Tournai.

During Spanish rule (1521–1667) the see continued to be occupied by natives of the country, but the seize of Tournai by Louis XIV in 1667 caused it to have a number of Frenchmen for bishop: Gilbert de choiseul duplessis praslin (1670–1689); François de La Salle de Caillebot (1692–1705); Louis Marcel de Coëtlogon (1705–1707); François de Beauveau (1708–1713). After the Treaty of Utrecht (1713) the French were replaced by Germans: Johann Ernst, Count of Löwenstein-Wertheim (1713–1731); Franz Ernst, Count of Salm-Reifferscheid (1731–1770); Wilhelm Florentine, Prince of Salm-Salm (1776–1794).

The reunion of the see with Noyon and the ensuing removal of the seat of the bishopric bolstered the chapter. The chapter's requirement to appoint only nobility and scholars, as set forth by the old régime, tended to attract the highly born and educated. Illustrious French and Belgian names are inscribed in the archive's registers and on the cathedral's tombstones. The nave and transept are Romanesque (12th century), while the choir is primary Gothic, begun in 1242 and completed in 1325.

Originally, the borders of the diocese arguably were those of the Civitas Turnacensium, as mentioned in the "Notice des Gaules". The prescriptions of councils and the interest of the Church both favoured such borders, and they were retained throughout the Middle Ages. The diocese then further extended along the left bank of the river Schelde, from the river Scarpe to the North Sea, with the exception of the Vier-Ambachten (Hulst, Axel, Bouchaute, and Assenede), which are said to have always belonged to the Diocese of Utrecht. The Schelde thus formed the natural border between the Dioceses of Tournai and Cambrai, cutting through the towns of Termonde, Ghent, Oudenarde, and Tournai itself. The North Sea seaboard between the Schelde and the Yser was wholly part of this perimeter. On the far side of the Yser resided the Diocese of Thérouanne, which bordered Tournai as far as Ypres. There began the Diocese of Arras, which bordered Tournai as far as the confluence of the Scarpe and the Schelde at Mortgne, France. This vast diocese was for a long time divided into three archdeaneries and twelve deaneries. The archdeanery of Bruges comprised the deaneries of Bruges, Ardenbourg, and Oudenbourg; the archdeanery of Ghent, the deaneries of Ghent, Roulers, Oudenarde, and Waes; the archdeanery of Tournai, the deaneries of Tournai, Seclin, Helchin, Lille, and Courtrai.

In 1559, to support the war against Protestantism, King Philip II of Spain obtained from Paul IV the foundation of a series of new dioceses. The ancient Diocese of Tournai was split up, with nearly two-thirds of its territory being cut away. The outlines of the archdeaneries of Bruges and Ghent formed the new diocese of Bruges and diocese of Ghent, and six parishes passed to the new diocese of Ypres. This situation lasted until the beginning of the 19th century. The French Revolution created the Department of Jemappes, which in 1815 became the Province of Hainaut, whose borders coincided with those of the Diocese of Tournai, after a concordat between the plenipotentiaries of Pius VI and the consular government of the republic. The Bishop of Tournai retained only two scores of the parishes formerly under his jurisdiction, but received on the right bank of the Schelde a number of parishes which, prior to the Revolution, had belonged to the Diocese of Cambrai (302), Namur (50), and Liège (50).

Bishops

To 1146
 540 : St. Eleutherius of Tournai (Eleuthere)
 c. 549 and 552 : Agrecius
 545 : Medardus
Then jointly with Noyon
 c. 626–c. 638 : Acarius
 641–660 : Eligius
 c. 661–c. 686 : Mummolenus
 Gondoin
 c. 700 : Antgaire
 c. 715 : Chrasmar
 c. 721 : Garoul
 c. 723 : Framenger
 c. 730 : Hunuan
 c. 740 : Gui et Eunuce
 c. 748 : Elisée
 c. 756/765 : Adelfred
 ?     : Didon
 769–c. 782 : Giselbert
 c. 798/799 : Pleon
 c. 815 : Wendelmarus
 c. 830/838 : Ronegaire
 c. 830/838 : Fichard
 840–860 : Immon
 860–879 : Rainelme
 880–902 : Heidilon
 909 : Rambert
 915–932 : Airard
 †936 : Walbert
 937–950 : Transmar, Transmarus
 950–954 : Rudolf
 954–955 : Fulcher
 955–977 : Hadulphe
 977–988 : Liudolf of Vermandois
 989–997 : Radbod I
 1000–1030 : Hardouin
 1030–1044 : Hugo
 1044–1068 : Balduin
 1068–1098 : Radbod II
 1099–1112 : Baldric of Noyon
 1114–1123 : Lambert
 1123–1146 : Simon of Vermandois
 Diocese split

1146 to 1500; bishops of Tournai
 1146–1149 : Anselm
 1149–1166 : Gerard
 1166–1171 : Walter
 1173–1190 : Everard
 1193–1203 : Stephen of Tournai
 1203–1218 : Gossuin
 1219–1251 : Walter of Marvis
 1252–1261 : Walter of Croix
 1261–1266 : Johann I. Buchiau
 1267–1274 : John of Enghien
 1275–1282 : Philipp Mus
 1283–1291 : Michael von Warenghien
 1292–1300 : Johann III. von Vassogne
 1301–1324 : Guy of Boulogne (also Bishop of Cambrai)
 1324–1326 : Elie de Ventadour
 1326–1333 : Guillaume de Ventadour
 1333            : Theobald of Saussoire
 1334–1342 : André Ghini
 1342–1349 : Jean IV. des Prés
 1349–1350 : Pierre de Forest (also Bishop of Paris)
 1351–1377 : Pierre d'Arbois
 1379–1388 : Pierre d'Auxy
 1380–1384 : Jean de West
 1388–1410 : Louis de la Trémouille
 1410–1433 : Jean de Thoisy
 1433–1437 : Jean d'Harcourt
 1437–1460 : Jean Chevrot
 1460–1473 : Guillaume Fillastre
 1474–1483 : Ferry de Clugny
 1483–1505 : Schism

1500 to 1800
 1505–1513 : Charles de Hautbois
 1514–1518 : Thomas Wolsey
 1519–1524 : Louis Guillard, bishop-elect from 1513 but displaced by Wolsey until 1519
 1524–1564 : Charles de Croÿ
 1564–1574 : Gilbert d'Oignies
 1574–1580 : Pierre Pintaflour
 1580–1586 : Maximilien Morillon
 1586–1592 : Jean Vendeville (Jean Venduille)
 1592–1597 : Vacant
 1597–1614 : Michel D'Esne
 1614–1644 : Maximilien Villain
 1644–1660 : François Villain
 1660–1689 : Gilbert de Choiseul
 1689–1705 : François de Caillebot de La Salle
 1705–1707 : Louis-Marcel de Coëtlogon-Méjusseaume
 1707–1713 : René de Beauveau (then Bishop of Toulouse)
 1713–1731 : Johann Ernst von Löwenstein-Wertheim
 1731–1770 : Franz Ernst von Salm-Reifferscheid
 1770–1776 : Vacant
 1776–1793 : Wilhelm Florentin von Salm-Salm (then Archbishop of Prague)
 1793–1802 : Vacant

From 1800
 1802–1819 : François-Joseph Hirn
 1819–1829 : Vacant
 1829–1834 : Jean Joseph Delplancq
 1835–1872 : Gaspard-Joseph Labis
 1873–1880 : Edmond Dumont
 1881–1897 : Isidore-Joseph du Rousseaux
 1897–1915 : Carolus Gustavus Walravens
 1915–1924 : Amédée Crooy
 1924–1939 : Gaston-Antoine Rasneur
 1940–1945 : Luigi Delmotte
 1945–1948 : Etienne Carton de Wiart
 1948–1977 : Charles-Marie Himmer
 1977–2002 : Jean Huard
 2003–present : Guy Harpigny

References

 
Tournai
Religious organizations established in the 1140s
1146 establishments in Europe
Roman Catholic dioceses established in the 12th century
Tournai